Rodney Dewayne Priestley (born 1979) is an American chemical engineer and Professor at Princeton University. His research considers the phase transitions of polymers and their application in electronic devices and healthcare. In 2020 he was made the Princeton University Vice Dean of Innovation. He was named dean of  The Graduate School effective June 1, 2022.

Early life and education 
Priestley grew up watching documentaries on National Geographic. He originally considered studying marine biology or geology. During high school he became increasingly interested in chemistry. Priestley eventually studied chemical engineering at Texas Tech University and graduated in 2003, where he competed in long jump. As part of a Research Experiences for Undergraduates programme at the University of Connecticut Priestley first encountered polymers; with the look to develop artificial bone materials. He completed his doctoral research at Northwestern University, where he studied nanoscale confinement of polymers. In particular, Priestley made use of fluorescence and dielectric spectroscopy to investigate how confinement and interfacial effects impacted the glass transition temperature and physical ageing of polymers. Priestley was a postdoctoral fellow at the Ecole Superieure de Physique et de Chimie Industrielles de la Ville de Paris (ESPCI).

Research and career 
In 2009 Priestley returned to the United States and joined the faculty at Princeton University. At Princeton, Priestley studies the nanoscale properties of materials, and how to tune these for novel device applications. He has continued to study the glass transition temperatures of polymers, with a focus on the controlled formation of thin films and nanocolloids. Priestley has studied the transition temperatures of substances that are composed of two or more polymers, attaching fluorescent reporting tags to the different components and using the brightness of the tag to infer whether the polymer is in a glassy or rubbery phase. As part of this work, Priestley studied plexiglas, a composite system of poly(methyl methacrylate) (PMMA) and poly(butyl methacrylate) (PBMA) that is found in coronary stents and paints. He combines experimental studies with computational investigations to better understand the distribution of the PMMA and PBMA throughout the plexiglass. Through his understanding of phase transitions, Priestley has shown that it is possible to precisely control nanostructures, and realised self-assembled biopolymers for use in artificial skin.  Alongside his work on polymeric systems, Priestley has investigated nanoparticles, specifically engineered nanoscale zerovalent iron (enZVI) particles, as a means to clean groundwater. He proposed the use of Janus particles for the use in surfactant-free cleansing.

In 2019 Priestley was promoted to full Professor, and was one of the first African-Americans to hold such a position at Princeton University. In 2020 he was made Vice Dean of Innovation, and in 2022 named dean of The Graduate School. He is the founder of the science-based Cativa health cannabidiol. Priestley is an Associate Editor of JACS Au, an open-access journal.

Awards and honours 

 2009 ACS Young Investigator Award
 2011 National Science Foundation Career Award
 2013 Presidential Early Career Award for Scientists and Engineers
 2013 American Physical Society PPG/DPOLY Polymer Lecturer at the University of Sheffield
 2014 National Academy of Engineering Frontiers of Engineering 
 2014 Purdue University Duncan and Suzanne Mellichamp Lecture
 2014 American Society for Engineering Education Top 20 Under 40
 2014 The Root Most Influential African Americans
 2017 American Institute of Chemical Engineers MSED Owens Corning Early Career Award
 2018 World Economic Forum Young Global Scientist
 2020 American Physical Society John H. Dillion Medal
 2020 American Chemical Society Macromolecules Young Investigator Award

Selected publications

References 

African-American chemists
Texas Tech University alumni
Northwestern University alumni
Princeton University faculty
Polymer scientists and engineers
1979 births
Living people
21st-century African-American people
20th-century African-American people